Börner or Boerner is a German surname. Notable people with the surname include:

Börner
Christina Ottiliana Börner, wife of Fritz Cronman (1640–1680)
Carl Julius Bernhard Börner (1880–1953), German entomologist
Manfred Börner (1929–1996), German physicist and inventor
Holger Börner (1931–2006), German politician
Julian Börner (born 1991), German footballer
Jacqueline Börner (born 1965), East German speed skater and Olympic medalist
Katy Börner (born 1967), German engineer, scholar, author, and educator

Boerner
Christian Frederick Boerner (1683–1753), German theologian
Emil Louis Boerner [see: Boerner-Fry Company/Davis Hotel] (1899), Prussian-born American pharmacist
Francis Boerner [see: Croft & Boerner] (1889–1936), American architect
Friedrich Boerner (1723–1761), German physician and professor
Hermann Boerner (1906–1982), German mathematician
Larry Boerner (1905–1969), American baseball player
Nicole Boerner (born 1992), American fashion model

References

German-language surnames